Nadgrad ( or ) is a dispersed settlement in the Pohorje Hills in the Municipality of Slovenska Bistrica in northeastern Slovenia. The area is part of the traditional region of Styria. It is now included with the rest of the municipality in the Drava Statistical Region.

The settlement name in Slovene means 'above the castle'. This refers to a 12th-century castle, the ruins of which can still be seen on a hill south of the settlement.

References

External links
Nadgrad at Geopedia

Populated places in the Municipality of Slovenska Bistrica